is a village located in Gunma Prefecture, Japan. , the village had an estimated population of 9,546 in 3,999 households, and a population density of 28 persons per km².

Geography
Tsumagoi is situated on the northwestern corner of Gunma Prefecture, touching Nagano Prefecture to the north, south, and west. Because of its elevated location and the ash deposits of Mount Asama, Tsumagoi is well known for growing cabbages. Parts of the village are within the borders of then Jōshin'etsu-kōgen National Park.

 Mountains: Mount Asama (2568m), Mount Motoshirane (2171m), Mount Kusatsu-Shirane (2160m), Mount Azumaya (2354m)
 Rivers: Agatsuma River
 Lakes: Lake Baragi, Lake Tashiro

Surrounding municipalities
Gunma Prefecture
 Kusatsu
 Naganohara
Nagano Prefecture
 Karuizawa
 Komoro
 Takayama
 Suzaka
 Ueda
 Tōmi
 Miyota

Climate
Tsumagoi has a humid continental climate (Köppen Dfb) characterized by warm summers and cold winters with heavy snowfall, due to the high elevation. The average annual rainfall is 1345 mm with September as the wettest month.

Demographics
Per Japanese census data, the population of Tsumagoi has recently decreased after several decades of relative stability.

Tsumagoi has been recognized by Japan's Office for the Promotion of Regional Revitalization (Kishida Cabinet Secretariat), which promotes the development of new technologies to combat depopulation, for meeting a "high standard" (高水準) of digital transformation/telework infrastructure. Related projects have been awarded over ¥7.0M in government grants.

History
Numerous Jōmon period remains have been found in Tsumagoi, although later Yayoi period artifacts are almost non-existent, as the area is not suitable for rice cultivation. During the Edo period, the area around Tsumagoi was part of the hatamoto-administered territory within Kōzuke Province. Kanbara area (鎌原村) was severely damaged by the Tenmei eruption of Mt. Asama in 1783 (477 people died). With the creation of the modern municipalities system after the Meiji Restoration on April 1, 1889, the village of Tsumagoi was created within Agatsuma District of Gunma Prefecture.

Government
Tsumagoi has a mayor-council form of government with a directly elected mayor and a unicameral village council of 12 members. Tsumagoi collectively with the other municipalities in Agatsuma District, contributes two members to the Gunma Prefectural Assembly. In terms of national politics, the village is part of Gunma 5th district of the lower house of the Diet of Japan.

Economy

The economy of Tsumagoi is primarily agricultural, with cabbage forming the most noted local crop. Seasonal tourism primarily in connection with its onsen hot spring resorts and ski resorts are also major contributors to the local economy.

Education
Tsumagoi has two public elementary schools and one public middle school operated by the town government, and one public high schools operated by the Gunma Prefectural Board of Education.

Senior high schools
 Tsumagoi High School

Junior high schools
 Tsumagoi Junior High School

Elementary schools
 Higashi Elementary School
 Nishi Elementary School

Transportation

Railway
 JR East – Agatsuma Line
 -  -

Highway

Local attractions
The main draw of tourists to Tsumagoi are the onsen (natural hot spring) resorts, some of which are also associated with ski resorts. There are two major hot spring resort areas within the town. 

Palcall Tsumagoi Mountain Resort
Manza Onsen and ski resort
Kazawa Onsen and ski resort
Tsumagoi Onsen
Handeki Onsen

Noted people from Tsumagoi
Akira Kuroiwa, Olympic gold medalist speed skater
Toshiyuki Kuroiwa, Olympic  silver medalist speed skater
Masato Kobayashi, professional baseball player

References

External links

Official Website 

Villages in Gunma Prefecture
Tsumagoi, Gunma